A Rondeña is a palo or musical form of flamenco originating in the town of Ronda in the province of Málaga in Spain.

In common with other palos originating in Málaga, the rondeña antedated flamenco proper and became incorporated into it during the 19th century.

History 

The rondeña has its origin in the fandango malagueño and it is said that it is "the oldest fandango actually known".

According to the experts, the name does not derive from "nocturnal rounds", as some have suggested, but is based solely on the name of the town Ronda.

The rondeña spread enormously throughout Andalusia in the 19th century, to such an  extent that numerous foreign observers, touring the region at the time, referred to it later in their writings.

Cante (Songs)

The rondeña has evolved in recent times, with a decrease in melismatic ornamentation, and generally the tempo is somewhat slower than was previously the case. It is a composition with an ad lib time signature  ( compás ), and the lyrics are frequently about rustic life. A verse consists of four octosyllabic lines which sometimes become five through repetition of the second line.

Baile (Dances)
In dance, having had no time signature at one time, the rondeña displays a rhythm of wild abandon.  Some dancers have used the rhythm of the taranto, which has many similarities but, being rondeña, more open and evocative.

Exponents
Among its higher representer we can find: Miguel Borrull senior, who was one of its forerunners, and Ramón Montoya, the first big interpreter to ennoble the genre.

Once in the 20th Century, we can highlight Manolo Sanlúcar as a player, and cantaores (singers) like Fosforito, Antonio de Canillas, Alfredo Arrebola, Jacinto Almadén, Juan de la Loma, Enrique Orozco, Antonio Ranchal, Rafael Romero, José Menese and Cándido de Málaga.

Popular rondeñas
Rondeñas vienen cantando,

sobre la cama me siento,

porque, en oyendo rondeñas,

se me alegra el pensamiento.

Las rondeñas malagueñas

cántamelas, primo mio,

que al son de las malagueñas

me voy quedando dormío.

Recommended bibliography

Diccionario Enciclopédico Ilustrado del Flamenco. Ed. Cinterco.
MANFREDI CANO, Domingo. Geografía del Cante Flamenco. Ed. Serv. Publicaciones de la Universidad de Cádiz. 1988.
NÚÑEZ, Faustino. Todo el Flamenco. Club Internacional del libro, Madrid. 1988.
DVD: Paso a Paso. Los palos del flamenco. Rondeña

Flamenco
Province of Málaga
Andalusian culture